Jonnathan Kevin Varas Marcillo (born 26 May 1993) is an Ecuadorian professional footballer who plays as a midfielder for  club Pergolettese.

Club career
Formed on Darfo Boario youth system, Varas made his senior debut for the first team in 2011–12 Serie D season.

On 4 August 2020, he joined Serie C club Pergolettese.

References

External links
 
 

1993 births
Living people
Sportspeople from Guayaquil
Ecuadorian footballers
Italian footballers
Association football midfielders
Serie C players
Serie D players
Eccellenza players
U.S. Darfo Boario S.S.D. players
F.C. Lumezzane V.G.Z. A.S.D. players
S.S. Teramo Calcio players
F.C. Pro Vercelli 1892 players
U.S. Pergolettese 1932 players
Ecuadorian expatriate footballers
Ecuadorian expatriate sportspeople in Italy
Expatriate footballers in Italy